Işıklı Yol is İzel's seventh studio album. It was released in 2007. This album has songs mostly written by Sinan Akçıl.

Track listing

Credits
Production: Avrupa Müzik
Producer: Sinan Akçıl
Mix: DM Müzik, Bahia Music, RMS
Mastering: Soundgarden (Hamburg)
Photographs: Lara Sayılgan
Graphic Design: Özlem Semiz
Hair: Turhan Çakar
Make-up: Neriman Eröz

Music videos

İzel Çeliköz albums
2007 albums